Wayne Ferreira was the defending champion but lost in the first round to Jérôme Golmard.

Mark Philippoussis won in the final 6–4, 7–6(7–4) against Richey Reneberg.

Seeds

  Marcelo Ríos (first round)
  Wayne Ferreira (first round)
  Carlos Moyá (quarterfinals)
  Albert Costa (quarterfinals)
  Andre Agassi (first round)
  Alberto Berasategui (first round)
  MaliVai Washington (first round)
  Richey Reneberg (final)

Draw

Finals

Top half

Bottom half

External links
 Main draw

1997
1997 ATP Tour
1997 Tennis Channel Open